Donnan Plumb (born August 22, 1938) is an American equestrian. She competed in two events at the 1968 Summer Olympics.

References

External links
 

1938 births
Living people
American female equestrians
American dressage riders
Olympic equestrians of the United States
Equestrians at the 1968 Summer Olympics
Pan American Games medalists in equestrian
Pan American Games silver medalists for the United States
Equestrians at the 1967 Pan American Games
Sportspeople from Philadelphia
Medalists at the 1967 Pan American Games
21st-century American women